Archery Association of India (AAI) is the national governing body of archery in India. Its headquarters are located in New Delhi, and its current president is Arjun Munda, AAI is a non-profit, government funded organisation affiliated by World Archery Federation (IAF), Asian Archery Federation (AAF) and Indian Olympic Association (IOA) and recognized by Ministry of Youth Affairs and Sports of India.

AAI came into existence on 8 August 1973 after archery was reintroduced to the Olympic Games in 1972. It is responsible for organising, promoting and controlling the sport of archery in India.

See also
 Abhimanyu Sindhu
 Haryana Archery Association 
 Haryana 
 International Archery Federation (IAF) 
Dola Banerjee
Indian Archers

References

External links
Official Website

India
Archery
Archery in India
Archery organizations
Sports organizations established in 1973
1973 establishments in Delhi
Organisations based in Delhi